NATO reporting name for SS series surface-to-surface missiles, with Soviet designations:

 SS-1 "Scunner" (R-1) and "Scud" (R-11/R-300)
 SS-2 "Sibling" (R-2)
 SS-3 "Shyster" (R-5/R-5M)
 SS-4 "Sandal" (R-12)
 SS-5 "Skean" (R-14)
 SS-6 "Sapwood" (R-7)
 SS-7 "Saddler" (R-16)
 SS-8 "Sasin" (R-9/R-9A)
 SS-9 "Scarp" (R-36)
 SS-10 "Scrag" (GR-1)
 SS-11 "Sego" (UR-100)
 SS-12 "Scaleboard" (9M76)
 SS-13 "Savage" (RT-2)
 SS-14 "Scapegoat" and "Scamp" (RT-15)
 SS-15 "Scrooge" (RT-20)
 SS-16 "Sinner" (15Zh42)
 SS-17 "Spanker" (MR-UR-100)
 SS-18 "Satan" (R-36M)
 SS-19 "Stiletto" (UR-100N)
 SS-20 "Saber" (RT-21M/15Zh45)
 SS-21 "Scarab" (9M79)
 SS-22 "Scaleboard" (9M76)
 SS-23 "Spider" (9M714)
 SS-24 "Scalpel" (RT-23)
 SS-25 "Sickle" (RT-2PM)
 SS-26 "Stone"
 SS-27 "Sickle-B" (RT-2UTTH) (Topol-M)
 SS-28 "Saber 2" (15Zh53)
 SS-X-29 (RS-24) (Yars)
 SS-X-30 Sarmat/"Unknown" (RS-28)
 SS-X-31 (RS-26)
 SS-X-32 (BZhRK Barguzin)
  SSC-X-9 "Skyfall" (9M730 Burevestnik)

US DoD designations for SS-N series naval surface-to-surface missiles (fired from ships and submarines), with Soviet designations:

 SS-N-1 "Scrubber" (4K40) (P-1)
 SS-N-2 "Styx" (4K51) (P-15)
 SS-N-3 "Sepal" (R-35/4K44/3M44) and "Shaddock" (4K95) (P-5)
 SS-N-4 (R-13)
 SS-N-5 "Sark" (R-21)
 SS-N-6 "Serb" (R-27)
 SS-N-7 "Starbright" (4M66) (P-70 Ametist)
 SS-N-8 "Sawfly" (R-29)
 SS-N-9 "Siren" (4K85) (P-120 Malakhit)
 SS-NX-10
 SS-NX-11
 SS-N-12 "Sandbox" (4K77/4K80) (P-500 Bazalt)
 SS-NX-13 (R-27K)
 SS-N-14 "Silex" (83R/84R/85R)
 SS-N-15 "Starfish" (82R)
 SS-N-16 "Stallion" (86R/88R)
 SS-N-17 "Snipe" (R-31)
 SS-N-18 "Stingray" (R-29R)
 SS-N-19 "Shipwreck" (3M45) (P-700 Granit)
 SS-N-20 "Sturgeon" (R-39 Rif)
 SS-N-21 "Sampson" (S-10 Granat)
 SS-N-22 "Sunburn" (3M80) (P-270 Moskit)
 SS-N-23 "Skiff" (R-29RM), (R-29RMU2 Sineva), (R-29RMU2.1 Layner)
 SS-N-24 "Scorpion" (3M25) Kh-80 (AS-19 Koala) (P-750 Meteorit)
 SS-N-25 "Switchblade" (3M24) Kh-35 (AS-20 Kayak) Uran
 SS-N-26 "Strobile" (3M55) (P-800 Oniks 'Yakhont')
 SS-N-27 "Sizzler" (3M54) Kalibr ("Club" is the export version.) 
 SS-NX-28 - no name yet - (R-39M Grom)
 SS-N-29 - no name yet - RPK-9 Medvedka (89R)
 SS-N-30 - no name yet - (3M14) Land attack missile ("Club" is the export version.)
 SS-NX-32 - no name yet - RSM-56 Bulava (3M30)

See also: NATO reporting name

References
 

surface-to-surface missiles